The detachable thumb (unknown originator) is a close-up illusion.

Effect
The performer appears to remove the end of his own thumb; moving it back and forth along his hand or lifting it up.

Method
There is no particular secret to this illusion: the performer simply holds out one hand sideways with the palm out and the tip of the thumb folded down behind the hand. Then, they place their other thumb bent so that the tip appears to be connected to the folded-down thumb with the forefinger bent to cover the joint.

See also 
 Thumb tip

References

Magic tricks